is a passenger railway station in located in the city of Ise,  Mie Prefecture, Japan, operated by the private railway operator Kintetsu Railway.

Lines
Asama Station is served by the Toba Line, and is located 4.9 rail kilometers from the starting point of the line at Ujiyamada Station.

Station layout
The station was consists of two opposed side platforms built on an embankment. The station has no station building and the station is unattended.

Platforms

Adjacent stations

History
Asama Station opened on March 1, 1970.

Passenger statistics
In fiscal 2019, the station was used by an average of 117 passengers daily (boarding passengers only).

Surrounding area
Mount Asama hiking trail

See also
List of railway stations in Japan

References

External links

 Kintetsu: Asama Station 

Railway stations in Japan opened in 1970
Railway stations in Mie Prefecture
Stations of Kintetsu Railway
Ise, Mie